The office of the Israeli Ambassador to the United States of America is the ambassador extraordinary and plenipotentiary from the State of Israel to the United States of America. It is generally regarded as the most prestigious position in the Israeli Ministry of Foreign Affairs due to the close diplomatic and military relationship between the two countries.

The ambassador and the embassy staff at large work at the Israeli Embassy in Washington, D.C.

Three ambassadors have been American citizens: Arens was naturalized and Oren and Dermer were born in the United States.

List of Ambassadors
Eliahu Eilat, 1948–1950 
Abba Eban, 1950–1959 
Avraham Harman, 1959–1968 
Yitzhak Rabin, 1968–1973
Simcha Dinitz, 1973–1979 
Ephraim Evron, 1979–1982 
Moshe Arens, 1982–1983 
Meir Rosenne, 1983–1987 
Moshe Arad, 1987–1990 
Zalman Shoval, 1990–1993 
Itamar Rabinovich, 1993–1996 
Eliahu Ben-Elissar, 1996–1998
Zalman Shoval, 1998–1999 
David Ivry, 1999–2002
Daniel Ayalon, 2002–2006
Sallai Meridor, 2006–2009
Michael Oren, 2009–2013
Ron Dermer, 2013–2021
Gilad Erdan, 2021
Mike Herzog, 2021–present

See also
Israel–United States relations
List of Israeli ambassadors
List of ambassadors of the United States to Israel
List of consuls general of Israel to the United States

References

External links
 Israeli Ambassadors to the United States (1948-Present)
 Former Ambassadors to the U.S.

 
United States
Israel